Ironville is a village in Derbyshire, England. The name may also refer to:

 Ironville, Nova Scotia, Canada
 Ironville, Kentucky, United States
 Ironville Historic District, Essex County, New York, United States
 Ironville, Pennsylvania, United States